The Indian River is a , primarily tidal river located entirely within the city of Chesapeake, Virginia, in the United States.  It is a tributary of the Eastern Branch Elizabeth River, leading to the harbor of Hampton Roads.

See also
List of rivers of Virginia

References

USGS Hydrologic Unit Map - State of Virginia (1974)

Rivers of Virginia
Bodies of water of Chesapeake, Virginia